Casey Kaplan is a contemporary art gallery in New York City, in the United States.

History
The gallery relocated in 2000 to a store-front gallery space in Chelsea / Meatpacking District on 14th Street. During this time, Casey Kaplan hosted the first ever New York solo exhibitions of many now canonized contemporary artists, such as Jason Dodge, Trisha Donnelly, Carsten Höller, Jonathan Monk and Simon Starling, in addition to staging solo shows with Liam Gillick and curatorial collaborations with Daniel Birnbaum and artist Douglas Gordon.

The gallery expanded once more in 2005 to a larger store-front on 21st street, before relocating in 2015 to our current , two-story space in the Flower District. Solo exhibitions in the new space have been staged by Kevin Beasley, Jordan Casteel, Sarah Crowner, N. Dash, Haris Epaminonda, Geoffrey Farmer, Mateo López, and Matthew Ronay, and the distinguished Turin-based abstract painter Giorgio Griffa, whose work had not been shown in New York since the 1970s.

Artists
Casey Kaplan Gallery represents several living artists, including:
 Kevin Beasley
 Matthew Brannon
 Jeff Burton, Nathan Carter
 Jordan Casteel (since 2016)
 Sarah Crowner (since 2014)
 N. Dash (since 2015)
 Jason Dodge
 Judith Eisler (since 2017)
 Haris Epaminonda
 Geoffrey Farmer
 Jonathan Gardner
 Liam Gillick
 Giorgio Griffa
 Brian Jungen
 Hannah Levy (since 2019)
 Mateo López
 Jonathan Monk
 Marlo Pascual
 Diego Perrone
 Matthew Ronay (since 2017)
 Hugh Scott-Douglas
 Simon Starling
 David Thorpe
 Garth Weiser

Art Fairs
The gallery has exhibited at the ADAA Art Show (New York, NY); Art Basel (Basel, Switzerland); Art Basel Miami Beach (Miami Beach, Florida); Frieze LA (Los Angeles, CA); Frieze New York (New York, NY); and Frieze London (London, UK).

References

External links 
 Official site

Art museums and galleries in Manhattan
1995 establishments in New York City
Art galleries established in 1995
Chelsea, Manhattan